The 1956 Australian Championships was a tennis tournament that took place on outdoor Grass courts at the Milton Courts, Brisbane, Australia from 20 January to 30 January. It was the 44th edition of the Australian Championships (now known as the Australian Open), the 4th held in Brisbane, and the first Grand Slam tournament of the year. The singles titles were won by Lew Hoad and Mary Carter Reitano.

Champions

Men's singles

 Lew Hoad defeated  Ken Rosewall  6–4, 3–6, 6–4, 7–5

Women's singles

 Mary Carter defeated  Thelma Coyne Long  3–6, 6–2, 9–7

Men's doubles
 Lew Hoad /  Ken Rosewall defeated  Don Candy /  Mervyn Rose 10–8, 13–11, 6–4

Women's doubles
 Mary Bevis Hawton /  Thelma Coyne Long defeated  Mary Carter /  Beryl Penrose 6–2, 5–7, 9–7

Mixed doubles
 Beryl Penrose  /  Neale Fraser defeated  Mary Bevis Hawton /  Roy Emerson 6–2, 6–4

References

External links
 Australian Open official website

1956
1956 in Australian tennis
January 1956 sports events in Australia